The American Dream is a national ethos of the United States in which freedom includes a promise of the possibility of prosperity and success.

American Dream and American Dreams or American Dreamz may also refer to:

People
"The American Dream" Dusty Rhodes (1945-2015), wrestler

Arts, entertainment, and media

Films
American Dream (film), a 1990 documentary
An American Dream (film), a 1966 film
The American Dream (film), a 2022 film
American Dreamz, a 2006 film

Literature
American Dream, Global Nightmare, a 2004 book by Ziauddin Sardar and Merryl Wyn Davies
American Dream, Global Nightmare: The Dilemma of U.S. Human Rights Policy, a 1980 book by Sandy Vogelgesang 
The American Dream (play), a 1960 play by Edward Albee

Music

Performers
The American Dream (band), a Philadelphia-based band

Albums and EPs
The American Dream (Allstar Weekend EP)
American Dream (Crosby, Stills, Nash & Young album) (1988)
American Dream (LCD Soundsystem album) (2017)
American Dreams (Charlie Haden album) (2002)
American Dreams (The Oak Ridge Boys album) (1989)
The American Dream (Mike Jones album) (2007)
The American Dream (Emitt Rhodes album) (1971)
The American Dream, a 2008 EP by Walls of Jericho
The American Dream a 1970 album by The American Dream
American Dream (Rocky Loves Emily EP)
The American Dream (Trophy Eyes album) (2018)
American Dream (Woe, Is Me EP)

Songs
"American Dream" (Casting Crowns song) (2003)
"American Dream" (Jakatta song) (2000)
"American Dream" (MKTO song) (2014)
"American Dream", a song by Crosby, Stills, Nash & Young from American Dream
"American Dream", a song by Bad Religion from How Could Hell Be Any Worse? 
"American Dream", a song by Children of the Corn from The Collector's Edition
"American Dream", a song by Cold from Superfiction
"American Dream", a song by LCD Soundsystem from American Dream
"American Dream", a song by Silverstein from A Shipwreck in the Sand
"American Dream", a song by Chris Spedding from Enemy Within
"American Dream", a song by Switchfoot from Oh! Gravity.
"American Dreams" (song), a 2017 song by Papa Roach
"American Dreams", a song by Flobots from Noenemies
"The American Dream" (song), a 1982 song by Hank Williams, Jr.
"The American Dream", a song by Afroman from Because I Got High
"The American Dream", a song from the musical Miss Saigon
"The American Dream", a song by Chicago from Chicago 14

Television
American Dream (TV series), a 1981 American TV series
American Dreams, a 2002–2005 American TV series
Trump: An American Dream, a 2017 British television documentary series

Other uses in arts, entertainment, and media
American Dream (comics), a Marvel Comics superhero character
American Dream (video game), a 1989 video game for the Nintendo Entertainment System
American Dreams, a fictional baseball team in the Baseball Stars videogame series

Brands and enterprises
Americone Dream, a flavor of Ben & Jerry's Ice Cream
American Dream Meadowlands, a shopping mall in East Rutherford, New Jersey
American Dream Miami, a proposed shopping mall in Miami-Dade County, Florida

Other uses
American Dream Downpayment Assistance Act
Center for a New American Dream, a nonprofit organization
The American Dream, a limousine built by Jay Ohrberg

See also
American Dreamer (disambiguation)
American Dreaming (disambiguation)
An American Dream (disambiguation)